Pays des Olonnes Basket is a French professional basketball team located in Olonne-sur-Mer, France. The team currently competes in the NM2.

The club is internationally known because some of its players have represented their African national teams at the FIBA Africa Championship.

Notable players
To appear in this section a player must have either:
 Set a club record or won an individual award as a professional player.
 Played at least one official international match for his senior national team or one NBA game at any time.
 Andaman Koffi 
 Naim El Khdar

Informations
au POB, on peut commencer le basket à l'age de 4 ans. ils y a 5 catégories au pole féminin: U11 (9'10 ans), U13 ( 11'12 ans), U15 ( 13'14 ans), U18 ( 15'16'17 ans), RF2 (séniors).
ils y a 9 catégories au pole masculin: U9 (7'8 ans), U11 (9'10 ans), U13 (11'12 ans), U15 ( 13'14 ans), U18( 15'16'17 ans) Prénational, National.
les partenaires: Vendée le département, Leclerc, homkia, la fournée doré, spalding...

les NM2 (National Masculin) est le plus haut niveau joué au POB. Grégory Lessort est un joueur de cette équipe, son frère https://fr.wikipedia.org/wiki/Mathias_Lessort est assez connu dans ce milieu, il a été drafté au Etats Unis, 76ers de Philadelphie.

External links
Presentation at Eurobasket.com
Presentation at Facebook

https://www.pob-basket.com/

Basketball teams in France
Basketball teams established in 2006
Vendée